The Kew Gardens Interchange is a complex junction in Kew Gardens, in the center of the New York City borough of Queens serving nearly 600,000 vehicles daily.

Description

The Kew Gardens Interchange is located roughly midway between LaGuardia Airport and John F. Kennedy International Airport. Highways feeding into the Kew Gardens Interchange include the Grand Central Parkway, Interstate 678 (the Van Wyck Expressway), the Jackie Robinson Parkway, Queens Boulevard (New York State Route 25), and Union Turnpike.

The Kew Gardens Interchange is an incomplete junction. The Grand Central Parkway connects to and from the Jackie Robinson Parkway in both directions, but access to I-678 south is only served by eastbound exit and westbound entrance ramps. The Jackie Robinson Parkway, which terminates at this interchange, connects to both directions of the Grand Central Parkway, but only serves I-678 north. The northbound lanes of the Van Wyck Expressway (I-678) only serve the westbound Grand Central Parkway, while the southbound lanes only serve the Jackie Robinson Parkway.

All directions of the limited access highways provide access to Union Turnpike, which also intersects to Queens Boulevard (NY 25) to the west and Main Street to the east.

Missing connections

History
A distorted trumpet between Grand Central Parkway and Jackie Robinson Parkway (Interboro Parkway), with Union Turnpike appearing somewhat as a service road, was constructed in the 1930s. Connections to the Van Wyck Expressway were added later.

On August 18, 2010, the New York State Department of Transportation broke ground on the first phase of reconstruction of the Kew Gardens interchange. The renovation project includes the renovations of the nearby Queens Boulevard viaduct over the Van Wyck Expressway and the nearby Briarwood subway station.

References

External links

Empire State Roads Interchange of the Week, Monday, May 7, 2001 (with images)

Transportation in Queens, New York
Road interchanges in the United States